
Gmina Płoty is an urban-rural gmina (administrative district) in Gryfice County, West Pomeranian Voivodeship, in north-western Poland.

Villages
Apart from the town of Płoty, Gmina Płoty contains the villages and settlements of Bądkowo, Bucze, Charnowo, Czarne, Dąbie, Dalimierz, Darszyce, Dobiesław, Gardomino, Gościejewo, Gostyń Łobeski, Gostyński Bród, Jarzysław, Karczewie, Kłodno, Kobuz, Kocierz, Kopaniny, Krężel, Łęczna, Lisowo, Łowiska, Luciąża, Lusowo, Makowice, Makowiska, Mechowo, Modlimowo, Natolewice, Natolewiczki, Ostrobodno, Pniewko, Pniewo, Potuliniec, Słudwia, Sowno, Truskolas, Wicimice, Wicimiczki, Wilczyniec, Wyszobór, Wyszogóra and Wytok.

Neighbouring gminas
Gmina Płoty is bordered by the gminas of Brojce, Golczewo, Gryfice, Nowogard, Resko and Rymań.

References
Polish official population figures 2006

Ploty
Gryfice County